Jordan Robinson is an English football defender or midfielder.

Previously a youth team player at Middlesbrough, he signed for Wigan Athletic in 2010, and made his first-team debut in an FA Cup third round match against Hull City on 8 January 2011.

In September 2012, Robinson signed for Northern League side Billingham Synthonia, and made his debut on 29 September against Shildon. He then played for Darlington 1883 and Spennymoor Town and signed for Ytterhogdal of the Swedish Football Division 3 (level 5) in December 2015.

In June 2018, Robinson joined Stockton Town of the Northern League Division One to help their push for promotion and played a key part in the 2019–20 team that were top of the league before the league was deemed null and void due to the coronavirus outbreak.

References

External links

1991 births
Living people
People from Yarm
Footballers from County Durham
Sportspeople from Yorkshire
English footballers
Association football defenders
Wigan Athletic F.C. players
Billingham Synthonia F.C. players
Darlington F.C. players
Spennymoor Town F.C. players
Stockton Town F.C. players